Heaven's Pregnant Teens is the first and only studio album by Californian punk band Some Girls. It was their last recording as a band before their break-up in 2007.

Track listing

"Religion II" is a cover of a Public Image Ltd. song from their album First Issue.

References

Some Girls (California band) albums
2006 albums